The house at 5 Prospect Hill in Somerville, Massachusetts is rare in the city as a Queen Anne house executed in brick.  Built c. 1880, it is a -story house with a side-gable roof and a projecting gable section on the left front.  A polygonal bay projects further from this gable section, with windows set in segmented-arch openings with a band of polychrome brickwork between.  A two-story porch extends from the side of the projecting section across the remainder of the front.  Other details of the exterior include bargeboard accents in the gables, and terra cotta insets in the brickwork.

The house was listed on the National Register of Historic Places in 1989.

See also
National Register of Historic Places listings in Somerville, Massachusetts

References

Houses on the National Register of Historic Places in Somerville, Massachusetts